Sevvel is a 2005 Indian Tamil-language film,  directed and produced by Primus. The film stars Rajkiran, Seetha, Jai Akash and Kalabhavan Mani.

Cast

Rajkiran as Sudalai 
Seetha as Sevanthi 
Jai Akash as Sevvel aka Raja
Kalabhavan Mani as Parasuram 
Vadivukkarasi
Misha Shah
 Radha Ravi as Lawyer
Livingston
Ilavarasu
Singamuthu
 Gowthami Vembunathan
 Bonda Mani
 Kovai Senthil

Production
The film began production in 2005. Actress Misha Shah made her debut in Tamil films through Sevvel. Jai Akash plays a lawyer. Rajkiran was cast as Jai Akash's father.

Soundtrack
The music was composed by Aasan and lyrics were written by Pa. Vijay, Muthuvijayan, Viveka, Kabilan, Guhan and Tamil Amudhan.

Release 
A critic from Sify opined that "All in all a disappointing venture from a debutant director". Balaji Balasubramaniam of BBThots gave the film a rating of one-and-a-half out of five stars and opined that "the film itself must provide something special to its audience. That unfortunately is not the case with Sevvel".

References

External links
 

2005 films
2000s Tamil-language films